Bagrichthys macropterus, the false black lancer, is a species of bagrid catfish found in Cambodia, China, Indonesia, Laos, Malaysia, Thailand and Vietnam.  It grows to a length of 30.0 cm and is commercially fished for human consumption.

References 
 

Bagridae
Fish of Asia
Freshwater fish of China
Freshwater fish of Indonesia
Freshwater fish of Malaysia
Fish of Thailand
Fish described in 1854